Incomptodessus is a genus of predaceous diving beetles in the family Dytiscidae. There is one described species in Incomptodessus, I. camachoi, found in the Neotropics.

References

Further reading

 
 
 

Dytiscidae